Gemfire (released in Japan as Royal Blood or ロイヤルブラッド Roiyaru Buraddo, Super Royal Blood or スーパーロイヤルブラッド Sūpā Roiyaru Buraddo in its Super Famicom version) is a medieval war game for MSX, Nintendo Entertainment System, Super NES, FM Towns, Mega Drive/Genesis, DOS, and later Microsoft Windows, developed by Koei. The object in the game is to unify a fictional island by force. Players use infantry, cavalry, and archers, as well as fantasy units such as magicians, dragons or gargoyles in order to capture the castle needed to control that particular territory.

A sequel, Royal Blood II, was released in the Japan market for Windows.

Plot 
The game takes place in the fictitious Isle of Ishmeria. Once upon a time, six wizards, each wielding a unique brand of magic, used their powers to protect the island and maintain peace. This was disrupted when they were collectively challenged by a Fire Dragon, summoned forth by a wizard intent on plunging the country into darkness.

The sea-dwelling dragon of peace known as the Pastha charged the six wizards with the task of fighting back. They succeeded, sealing the Fire Dragon away into a ruby at the top of a crown, and themselves became the six jewels around the crown's base. The crown, called Gemfire, was a symbol of utmost power and authority.

When Gemfire fell into the hands of the now current King of Ishmeria, Eselred, he sought to abuse the object's power, using it to embark on a tyrannical reign, instilling fear within his oppressed subjects. Ishmeria fell into despair as his power flourished. Finally, his young daughter, Princess Robyn, could not bear to watch her father's grievous misdeeds any longer — she seized Gemfire and pried the six wizard gems loose, causing them to shoot upward into the sky and circle briefly overhead before scattering themselves to different parts of Ishmeria. When a furious Eselred learned of Robyn's actions, he had her locked her away in a tower; but it was futile as the deed had already been done, and Robyn had taken the crucial first step toward freeing her people.

Meanwhile, the six wizards each take up residence with a prominent family of Ishmeria. The two most powerful of these clans are the Blanches, led by Prince Erin and supported by Zendor, Emerald Wizard and Wielder of Lightning; and the Lyles, led by Prince Ander and backed by Pluvius, Sapphire Wizard and Caster of Meteors. Four other clans (Flax, Coryll, Chrysalis and Molbrew) also have wizards (Scylla, Empyron, Chylla and Skulryk respectively) of Gemfire at their disposal in the beginning. With the breaking of the spell on Gemfire, each of these clans sets out to unseat Eselred, claim the throne as their own and restore order and peace to Ishmeria.

Gameplay

At the outset of the game, the player has the option of selecting a scenario and family. All four use the same game board but they differ in which families are present and what provinces, vassals and gems they have. The Blanche and Lyle families are present and playable in all four scenarios. The antagonistic Lankshire family is present in all four but can never be controlled by the player. Ultimately, the player must conquer the entire map to win the game.

Gameplay is divided into the main world map screen and individual battle screens. On the map screen, the player is allowed one action per turn (in-game month) per territory. With that action, the player may hire or move troops, upgrade the territory's economy or defenses, engage in diplomatic actions (such as plunder an adjacent province or propose alliance with another family), or attack an adjacent enemy territory.

Only adjacent territories may be attacked. Upon attacking or being attacked by an enemy, the focus shifts to battle, wherein a player may field five units (archers, knights, horsemen, and either a wizard or a hired unit). The player moves individual companies of troops about the map in a turn-based tactics fashion; certain units may build fences to keep enemies out. One army wins if the enemy base is captured, all enemy units are defeated, or the enemy army runs out of food.

References

External links
Gemfire at Mobygames 
Gemfire (Sega Genesis) can be played for free in the browser on the Internet Archive

1991 video games
DOS games
Fantasy video games
FM Towns games
Koei games
MSX2 games
Multiplayer and single-player video games
NEC PC-8801 games
NEC PC-9801 games
Nintendo Entertainment System games
Sega Genesis games
X68000 games
Super Nintendo Entertainment System games
Turn-based strategy video games
Turn-based tactics video games
Video games developed in Japan